is the 26th studio album by Japanese singer-songwriter Miyuki Nakajima.

In November 1999, it was simultaneously released with another album Moon: Wings which has a similar concept. Both albums contain the songs written for the series of Yakai, which had been her conventional plays performed over each December from 1989 through 1998.

Nakajima had a duet with Fumikazu Miyashita on the third track "Into a Dream Someday", a song arranged by David Campbell who also worked on most of Nakajima's albums recorded in the 1990s. Likewise, on the sixth track "I Don't Know Your Language", Campbell's spouse Raven Kane was featured on vocals.

To promote the album, a music video of the lead-off track was filmed. However, along with its follow-up, Sun became one of Nakajima's least successful albums in terms of sales. After those albums were released, she left the Pony Canyon which she had belonged to since debut.

Track listing
All songs written and composed by Miyuki Nakajima, arranged by Ichizo Seo (except "Into a Dream Someday" arranged by David Campbell).
"" – 5:53
"Never Cry over Spilt Milk" – 5:33
"" – 4:49
"" – 4:54
"" – 6:25
"" – 8:34
"" – 5:31
"" – 4:17
"Good Morning, Ms. Castaway" – 4:22
"" – 5:55

Personnel
Kenny Aronoff – drums
Gregg Bissonette – drums, cymbals
Hideo Yamaki – cymbals
Lee Sklar – bass
Bob Glaub – bass
Neil Stubenhaus – bass
Michael Thompson – electric guitar, acoustic guitar
Donald Ferrone – bass
Chiharu Mikuzuki – bass
Micheal Fisher – percussion
Yasuharu Nakanishi – keyboards, synth bass
Elton Nagata – keyboards
Ichizo Seo – keyboards
Jon Gilutin – keyboards, acoustic piano, electric piano, programming, pad, Indian pipe
Shingo Kobayashi – keyboards, programming
Keishi Urata – programming, drum-loop, percussion loop, sound effect
Seiichi Takubo – programming, drum-loop, percussion loop, sound effect
Manabu Ogasawara – programming, drum-loop
Yosuke Sugimoto – programming
David Campbell – strings conducting
Suzie Katayama – strings conducting, cello, accordion
Larry Corbett – cello
Daniel Smith – cello
Steve Richards – cello
Oscar Meza – cello, bass
Sid Page – violin (concertmaster), fiddle
Joel Derouin – violin (concertmaster)
Eve Butler – violin
Berj Garabedian – violin
Armen Garabedian – violin
Gerrardo Hilera – violin
Mario De Leon – violin
Erza Kliger – violin
Susan Charman – violin
John Wittenberg – violin
Murray Adler – violin
Michele Richards – violin
Edmund Stein – violin
Brian Leonard – violin
Robert Peterson – violin
Peter Kent – violin
Ruth Bruegger – violin
Virginia Frazier – violin
Robert Becker – viola
Matt Funes – viola
Scott Haupert – viola
Denyse Buffum – viola
Matthew Funes – viola
Renia Koven – viola
David Stenske – viola
Karie Prescott – viola
Sheridon Stokes – recorder
Earle Dumler – oboe
Kazuyo Sugimoto – lead and backing vocals
Fumikazu Miyashita – harmony and backing vocals
Julia Waters – backing vocals
Maxine Waters – backing vocals
Oren Waters – backing vocals
Yoko Kubota – backing vocals
Katsumi Maeda – backing vocals
Yoshihiko Shibata – backing vocals
Midori Sakaeda – backing vocals
Tatsuo Ogura – backing vocals
Gen-ichiro Nakajima – backing vocals
Koujiro Takizawa – backing vocals
Kazuaki Anzai – backing vocals
Rick Logan – backing vocals
John Batdorf – backing vocals
Joe Pizzulo – backing vocals
Raven Kane Campbell – vocals

Chart positions

Release history

References

Miyuki Nakajima albums
1999 albums